Manauri railway station is situated in Manauri bajar, Allahabad district, Uttar Pradesh, India. Its station code is MRE. It is one of the major railway stations for Kaushambi district and west area of Allahabad district

Trains 
The following are some trains that pass through Manauri railway station:

 Allahabad–Dehradun Link Express
 Sangam Express
 Allahabad–Kanpur Central MEMU (64591/64592)
 Chauri Chaura Express

References

Railway stations in Allahabad district